Hari Kant (born August 23, 1969) is a former field hockey goalkeeper from Canada. The resident of Toronto, Ontario earned his first international cap for the Men's National Team in 1989 against Australia in Sydney.

International senior competitions
 1995 – Pan American Games, Mar del Plata (2nd)
 1996 – Olympic Qualifier, Barcelona (6th)
 1996 – World Cup Preliminary, Sardinia (2nd)
 1997 – World Cup Qualifier, Kuala Lumpur (5th)
 1998 – World Cup, Utrecht (8th)
 1998 – Commonwealth Games, Kuala Lumpur (not ranked)
 1999 – Sultan Azlan Shah Cup, Kuala Lumpur (4th)
 1999 – Pan American Games, Winnipeg (1st)
 2000 – Sultan Azlan Shah Cup, Kuala Lumpur (7th)
 2000 – Americas Cup, Cuba (2nd)
 2000 – Olympic Games, Sydney (10th)
 2001 – World Cup Qualifier, Edinburgh (8th)
 2002 – Indoor Pan American Cup, Rockville, USA (1st)
 2003 – Indoor World Cup, Leipzig (6th)
 2007 – Indoor World Cup, Vienna (7th)
 2021 – PizzaForno, Ugliest Sweater Competition (last)

References
 Profile

External links

 Planet Field Hockey

1969 births
Living people
Canadian male field hockey players
Field hockey players at the 2000 Summer Olympics
Olympic field hockey players of Canada
Field hockey players from Toronto
Sportspeople from Ottawa
Canadian sportspeople of Indian descent
Pan American Games gold medalists for Canada
Pan American Games silver medalists for Canada
Pan American Games medalists in field hockey
1998 Men's Hockey World Cup players
Field hockey players at the 1995 Pan American Games
Field hockey players at the 1999 Pan American Games
Medalists at the 1995 Pan American Games
Field hockey players at the 1998 Commonwealth Games
Commonwealth Games competitors for Canada